Dimsdale is a suburb of Newcastle-under-Lyme in Staffordshire, England.

References

Newcastle-under-Lyme